Ghosts is the debut album of the Illbient band Techno Animal, released on Pathological Records in 1991.

Reception
Simon Reynolds, in reviewing the album for Melody Maker, said, "Ghosts isn't quite the long-awaited breakthrough, the one that makes The Young Gods seem ancient, but it's a brave stab in the right direction."

Track listing

Personnel

Techno Animal
Justin Broadrick – production, programming
Kevin Martin – instruments, vocals

References

External links
[ Ghosts entry at allmusic]

1990 debut albums
Techno Animal albums
Albums produced by Justin Broadrick